The Best of What's Around Vol. 1, also known as TBOWA Vol. 1, is a greatest hits compilation album by the Dave Matthews Band that was released on November 7, 2006.  The two-disc set is the Dave Matthews Band's first ever greatest hits album featuring 12 studio tracks on the first disc, and eight previously unreleased live tracks on the second disc.

Background
In July 2006, an email was sent out to members of the Dave Matthews Band's mailing list, informing fans that a compilation was to be released in September, and they were asked to choose 10 of their favorite live songs (and their specific dates).  The 10 most popular live songs were to be featured on the second disc of the compilation; however, only eight tracks are featured on disc two.  With the rising popularity of the band's latest live release, Live Trax Vol. 6, the compilation's release date was pushed back to November 7, 2006.  Inside the CD case of Live Trax Vol. 6 an advertisement for The Best of What's Around Vol. 1 was featured, incorrectly claiming that "Where Are You Going" was to be among the studio tracks appearing on disc one, and that the album was to be released on November 6, not November 7.  Sony BMG Music Entertainment released an advanced billing of the album, also incorrectly claiming that it was to feature a live version of "The Dreaming Tree."

Cover art
The album's cover art, designed to look like a concert ticket, features several hidden references:
1241998 – reference to December 4, 1998, the date the Warehouse Fan Association began
Saturday, April 20, 1991 – the date of the band's first ever show, performed at the Earth Day festival in Charlottesville, Virginia
Section 34, Row 36, Seat 41 – reference to three of the band's "numbered" songs:
"#34" (from Under the Table and Dreaming)
"#36" (from Live at Red Rocks, Listener Supported, and Live Trax Vol. 12)
"#41" (from Crash)
the barcode printed on the ticket is the UPC code of the album

Reception
The Best of What's Around, Vol. 1 sold 65,000 its first week, earning the  #10 spot on the Billboard 200. It was certified Gold on February 1, 2007.

Track listing
Disc one
"The Best of What's Around" – 4:16
"What Would You Say" – 3:42
"Crash into Me" – 5:16
"Too Much" – 4:21
"Rapunzel" – 6:00
"Crush" – 8:09
"So Right" – 4:40
"The Space Between" – 4:03
"Grey Street" – 5:07
"Grace Is Gone" – 4:38
"Hunger for the Great Light" – 4:21
"American Baby" – 4:35

Disc two
All tracks feature Butch Taylor.

"Don't Drink the Water" – 6:31 (Live 7/16/05, Sound Advice Amphitheatre, West Palm Beach, Florida)
"Warehouse" – 10:57 (Live 7/2/06, Alpine Valley Music Theater, East Troy, Wisconsin)
with Rashawn Ross
"Say Goodbye" – 9:26 (Live 7/5/00, Comerica Park, Detroit) (Incorrectly listed as 7/25/00)
"Stay (Wasting Time)" – 6:23 (Live 7/19/03, Verizon Wireless Amphitheater, Selma, Texas)
"Everyday" – 10:27 (Live 6/17/06, Saratoga Performing Arts Center, Saratoga Springs, New York)
with Vusi Mahlasela and Rashawn Ross
"Louisiana Bayou" – 7:24 (Live 6/26/05, Nissan Pavilion, Bristow, Virginia) (Incorrectly listed as 9/2/05)
with Robert Randolph
"Ants Marching" – 7:36 (Live 3/26/05, State Theatre, Sydney, New South Wales, Australia)
"Two Step" – 9:50 (Live 6/11/01, Giants Stadium, East Rutherford, New Jersey)

Encore CD
A bonus disc was also available for free as an incentive to anyone who pre-ordered the album online.  After the album's release, the bonus disc was available with the album for an extra price.

"Minarets" – 8:29 (Live 8/31/95, Great Woods, Mansfield, Massachusetts)
"#41" – 32:10 (Live 4/20/02, Corel Centre, Ottawa, Ontario, Canada)
with Butch Taylor and Béla Fleck and the Flecktones
"What You Are" – 9:08 (Live 6/16/06, Saratoga Performing Arts Center, Saratoga Springs, New York)
with Butch Taylor and Rashawn Ross
"The Last Stop" – 10:33 (Live 6/20/03, Darien Lake Performing Arts Center, Darien, New York)
with Butch Taylor

"What You Are" and "The Last Stop" from the Encore CD are featured as bonus tracks on the iTunes Store release of The Best of What's Around Vol. 1.

Notes

Albums produced by Glen Ballard
Albums produced by John Alagía
Albums produced by Mark Batson
Albums produced by Steve Lillywhite
Dave Matthews Band albums
2006 greatest hits albums